Hasan Boqeh (also Romanized as Ḩasan Boq‘eh) is a village in Howmeh Rural District, in the Central District of Harsin County, Kermanshah Province, Iran. At the 2006 census, its population was 153, in 35 families.

References 

Populated places in Harsin County